Kagamiiwa Zenshirō (born Zenshirō Sasaki, 4 May 1902 – 5 August 1950) was a sumo wrestler from Aomori Prefecture, Japan. His highest rank was ōzeki.

Career
Making his debut in 1921,
he won his first championship in the jonokuchi division in May 1922. He achieved 6 straight winning records and was promoted to makushita in 1925. He then won the makushita championship in  May 1927 and was promoted to makuuchi in 1928.  He secured his first kinboshi or gold star in January 1930 with a win over Miyagiyama, the first tournament in which the system was introduced. During the January 1931 tournament, he was runner up for the championship. He did not wrestle in 1932, but returned in 1933 and reached his highest rank of komusubi in May 1934. He was runner up for the championship a second time in January 1935 and reached the rank of sekiwake in January 1936. In January 1937, he was promoted to his final rank of ōzeki, simultaneously with Futabayama. At the age of 34 he was the oldest ever to be promoted to ōzeki. In January 1939 he had a bout with Banjaku that went on so long a rest break (mizu-iri) was called. Kagamiiwa chose to forfeit the re-match and so was given a loss by default (fusenpai) but his opponent sportingly refused to accept a default win, so both wrestlers were marked with a loss.

Retirement from sumo
He retired in May 1939. He had become head coach of Kumegawa stable while still active.  He recruited and trained yokozuna Kagamisato. In 1941 when Futabayama started his own stable, Kagamiiwa wound up his Kumegawa stable and merged it with Futabayama's (it became Tokitsukaze stable in 1945). He continued to work as a coach there until his death in 1950 at the age of 48.

Career record
In 1927 Tokyo and Osaka sumo merged and four tournaments a year in Tokyo and other locations began to be held.

See also
Glossary of sumo terms
List of sumo tournament top division champions
List of past sumo wrestlers
List of ōzeki

References 

1902 births
1950 deaths
Japanese sumo wrestlers
Sumo people from Aomori Prefecture
Ōzeki